Bandipotu is a 2015 Indian Telugu language heist comedy film directed by Mohan Krishna Indraganti and features Allari Naresh and Eesha Rebba in the lead roles while Srinivas Avasarala, Posani Krishna Murali, Tanikella Bharani and Sampoornesh Babu appear in other pivotal roles. The film is produced by Aryan Rajesh on EVV Cinema banner and is titled based on the N. T. Rama Rao's 1963 film of the same name. Kalyani Koduri composed the music while P.G. Vinda and Dharmendra Kakarala handled the cinematography and editing of the movie respectively.

The film was launched on 10 June 2014 at E. V. V. Satyanarayana's residence in Hyderabad. The principal photography started on 1 July 2014 at Rajahmundry. The film was made under the banner of E. V .V. Cinema, and, after delays, released on 20 February 2015. This film got mostly mixed to positive reviews from critics.

Plot
E. Vishwanath (Allari Naresh), commonly shortened to Vishwa, is a slick but principled criminal. He believes in "thieving from the thieves" - fooling the rich as a comeuppance for their greed. One day, a mysterious woman named Jahnavi (Eesha Rebba) comes into his life with evidence of his various frauds. She asks him to pull a massive con to get revenge on three people: Makrand Rao aka "Makrandam" (Tanikella Bharani), Seshagiri (Rao Ramesh) and Bhale Babu (Posani Krishna Murali). All three became "filthy rich" through embezzling the money of the poor in their chit fund. When their accountant and her father Satyanarayana (Subhalekha Sudhakar) discovered this and threatened to expose these activities, they framed and imprisoned him for the crime, leading to his depression and a stroke that put him in paralysed in the present. However, the three's greed also led to their split, and they aren't on friendly terms anymore. Upon hearing this, Vishwa not only agrees to defraud them, he rejects payment for personal reasons. He enrolls the help of his actor friend nicknamed Tellabbai  (Sampoornesh Babu), and using Jahnavi's experience with building cameras, the three start planning.

They first target Makrandam, who collects antiques, by convincing to buy a chest belonging to a rich zamindar. The chest contains a fake letter that purportedly states the location of some of the zamindar's wealth. Overjoyed, Makrandam and his assistant Chikati Rao (Srinivas Avasarala) buy the land from a local farmer and dig for the treasure that night. They find a chest, but see that it only contains shredded paper and a tape recorder declaring that they have been fooled. Vishwa and Tellabbai take their ladder and splash a concoction on them that makes them faint, and the next morning they are found in the hole, leading to their humiliation on live TV. However, Makrandam was able to see Vishwa's face when he dumped the solution.

Next, Vishwa goes after Seshagiri by posing as an American businessman. Seshagiri sees through his ruse, having learned about the defrauding of Makrandam, and claims that he can't be fooled. Vishwa challenges him to give a 10 crore (100 million) check to him under the condition that Seshagiri calls the bank beforehand to add extra permission requirements, which he accepts in his arrogance. The initially smug Seshagiri gets tensed over time checking if the check is deposited yet and shows his anger at work and at home. He then wakes up to discover that the check has been portrayed as a donation to charity, creating a national spectacle and leaving him no choice but to allow the check to be cashed. The ruling chief minister (Sayaji Shinde), jealous that he didn't give any money to him, cancels a contract for a 5000 crore (50 billion) hydropower project, angering Seshagiri, who decides to partner with Makrandam to figure out how to retaliate.

Finally, Vishwa gets Bhale Babu by revealing his knowledge of Bhale Babu's ambition to become Prime Minister of India as well as secret affair, and convinces him to run in the village elections while acting as is campaign manager. Their main opponent is Parvathalu (Chandra Mohan), a righteous man who decrys Bhale Babu's rowdyism through his newspaper Agni. To stop Parvathalu, Vishwa and Bhale Babu force him to sell his newspaper to them and withdraw. But at a press meet for his candidacy's filing, the campaign and manifesto videos are switched with ones that show his misdeeds. During the chaos, Jahnavi hugs Vishwa, which Chikati Rao, who had secretly followed Vishwa the whole time, reports to Seshagiri and Makrandam. Chikati Rao tries to pin the switch on Vishwa, but it turns out Vishwa had seen Chikati Rao earlier and instead plants the original videos in his bag, allowing him to escape. Makrandam and Seshagiri then visit Satyanarayana's house and threaten to kill him, but they came to know that they were being recorded as Vishwa reveals how Parvathalu and some others were merely playing roles in the scam. To save their skin, they admit Satyanarayana was wronged and establish a charitable foundation in his name. Vishwa reveals that his parents were victims of the original chit fund's scam, which is why he didn't take any fees, and goes back to his life of fraud with a purpose.

Cast
 Allari Naresh as E. Vishwanath aka Vishwa
 Eesha Rebba as Jahnavi
 Rao Ramesh as Seshagiri
 Posani Krishna Murali as Bhale Babu
 Tanikella Bharani as Makarandam
 Sampoornesh Babu as Tellabbai, Assistant of Vishwa
 Srinivas Avasarala as Cheekati, assistant of Makarandam
 Chandra Mohan as Parvathalu
 Shraddha Das in a special appearance
 Subhalekha Sudhakar as Satyanarayana, Jahnavi's father
 Saptagiri as TV reporter
 Snigdha as Guide
 Sayaji Shinde as Chief minister
 Khayyum as Venky, Seshagiri's son
 Aryan Rajesh as a businessman who was conned by Vishwa

Soundtrack
The Music Was Composed By Kalyan Koduri and Released by Lahari Music.

Reception

This film got mostly mixed reviews. jeevi gave 3.25/5
And 123 Telugu gave 3/5 and greatandhra gave 2.75 and most reviews said that the narration of film is slow that's why they trimmed the video from 141 min to 127 min

References

External links
 
 http://www.apherald.com/Movies/Reviews/79120/Bandipotu-Telugu-Movie-Review-Rating/
 http://www.awaitnews.com/movie-reviews/790889114/bandipotu-movie-review

2015 films
Indian crime comedy films
Indian heist films
2010s Telugu-language films
2010s heist films
2010s crime comedy films
Films directed by Mohan Krishna Indraganti
2015 comedy films